Jake Phillip Goodman (born 5 August 1993) is a professional footballer who plays as a defender for Dover Athletic.

Career
Goodman signed a professional contract with Millwall in 2012 under manager Kenny Jackett, turning down an offer from Premier League side Newcastle United.
On 4 March 2013, Goodman signed on loan for Conference side Luton Town making 11 appearances. Goodman then signed on loan for Aldershot Town on 1 August 2013 making 21 appearances and scoring 1 goal.
Goodman went on loan to League Two side AFC Wimbledon on 27 November 2014. On 8 January 2015, Goodman extended his loan at Wimbledon until the end of the season.

Goodman joined Braintree Town for the 2016–17 season, and then joined Maidenhead United in June 2017. He joined Bromley for the 2018–19 season. He suffered an anterior cruciate ligament injury which caused him to miss the entire 2019-20 season. For the 2020-21 season, he joined Ebbsfleet United. In June 2021, Goodman joined National League side Dover Athletic. Goodman was offered a new contract following relegation at the end of the 2021–22 season, re-signing two weeks later.

Career statistics

References

External links

1993 births
Living people
Footballers from Bexleyheath
English footballers
Association football defenders
Staines Town F.C. players
Millwall F.C. players
Luton Town F.C. players
Aldershot Town F.C. players
AFC Wimbledon players
Margate F.C. players
Braintree Town F.C. players
Maidenhead United F.C. players
Bromley F.C. players
Ebbsfleet United F.C. players
Dover Athletic F.C. players
English Football League players
National League (English football) players